Men's coxless pair competition at the 2008 Summer Olympics in Beijing was held between August 9 and 16, at the Shunyi Olympic Rowing-Canoeing Park.

This rowing event was a sweep event, meaning that each rower has one oar and rows on only one side. Two rowers crewed each boat, with no coxswain. The competition consists of multiple rounds. Finals were held to determine the placing of each boat; these finals were given letters with those nearer to the beginning of the alphabet meaning a better ranking. Semifinals were named based on which finals they fed, with each semifinal having two possible finals.

During the first round three heats were held. The top three boats in each heat advanced to the A/B semifinals, while all others were sent to the repechage. In the repechage, each boat had another chance to advance to the A/B semifinals, with the top three boats doing so. The remaining repechage finishers were sent to the C final.

Only A/B semifinals were held. For each of the two semifinal races, the top three boats moved on to the better of the two finals, while the bottom three boats went to the lesser of the two finals. For example, a second-place finish in an A/B semifinal would result in advancement to the A final.

The third and final round was the Finals. Each final determined a set of rankings. The A final determined the medals, along with the rest of the places through 6th. The B final gave rankings from 7th to 12th. The C final determined the places lower than 12th.

Schedule
All times are China Standard Time (UTC+8)

Results

Heats
Qualification Rules: 1-3->SA/B, 4..->R

Heat 1

Heat 2

Heat 3

Repechage
Qualification Rules: 1-3->SA/B, 4..->FC

Semifinals A/B
Qualification Rules: 1-3->FA, 4..->FB

Semifinal A/B 1

Semifinal A/B 2

Finals

Final C

Final B

Final A

References

External links
NYT Olympic Report

Rowing at the 2008 Summer Olympics
Men's events at the 2008 Summer Olympics